The Marine Corps Marathon (MCM) is an annual marathon held in Washington, D.C. and Arlington, Virginia. The mission of the MCM is to promote physical fitness, generate community goodwill, and showcase the organizational skills of the United States Marine Corps.

The MCM was established in 1976 and is currently the fourth largest marathon in the United States and the ninth largest in the world. The event field of 30,000 is composed of runners from all 50 states, the District of Columbia, and more than 50 countries. Known as "The People's Marathon", the MCM is open to all runners ages 14 and above and is the largest marathon that does not offer prize money.

The event typically occurs on the final Sunday in October, a few weeks before the United States Marine Corps' birthday on November 10.

History

On October 17, 1975, MCM founder Colonel James L. Fowler wrote a memo to his supervisor, Major General Michael P. Ryan, outlining his idea of creating a Marine Corps Reserve Marathon to promote goodwill between the military and the post-Vietnam community. Colonel Fowler believed an event like this would showcase the Marine Corps, serve as a recruiting tool, and give local Marines an opportunity to qualify for the Boston Marathon. The Marathon also serves as a way to raise money for a wide variety of charities.

General Ryan embraced the idea of a Marine marathon and submitted it to then Marine Corps Commandant General Louis H. Wilson Jr. for approval. With General Wilson's backing, the planning process for the first MCM began.  With news of the inaugural marathon quickly spreading, Gunnery Sergeant Alex Breckenridge, a member of the 1960 Olympic Marathon Team, soon lent his support. With Gunnery Sergeant Breckenridge acting as an ambassador for the marathon effort, local jurisdictions approved of the event. 

Through the efforts of the marathon coordinators and with support from Secretary of the Navy, J. William Middendorf, the inaugural running of the MCM was held on November 7, 1976. The 1,175 participants ran a course through northern Virginia and finished at the Marine Corps War Memorial, becoming the first of thousands of MCM runners over a span of 38 years to take the final hill and finish at the Iwo Jima memorial. Kenneth Moore of Eugene, Oregon, finished the inaugural event with a time of 2:21:14, becoming the first MCM winner. He was awarded a trophy—provided by Secretary Middendorf—for his achievement.

Marathon organizers examined the course for the 1977 MCM and secured permits to run through Washington, D.C. The new route laid the foundation for the scenic course in place today, starting in Arlington, Virginia, winding its way around key landmarks in the nation's capital, and returning for the traditional finish at the Marine Corps War Memorial. With changes to the course and a surge of positive publicity from the first running, the second MCM drew a field of 2,655 runners.

Participation in the MCM steadily increased over the next few years, resulting in a transfer of race coordination from the Marine Corps Reserve to active-duty Marines at Marine Barracks, Washington, D.C. Shortly thereafter, even more growth necessitated a move south to Marine Corps Base Quantico in 1982, where the MCM headquarters remains today.

Additions to MCM weekend include the MCM10K, starting at the National Mall and finishing at the Iwo Jima monument; the MCM Kids Run, a  event held one day prior to the MCM; and the MCM Forward, where Marines stationed throughout the world participate in a satellite  run simultaneously with the MCM. The MCM and all associated events continue to promote physical fitness, generate community goodwill and showcase the organizational skills of the United States Marine Corps.

The running of the 44th Marine Corps Marathon took place on October 27, 2019.

The 2020 in-person edition of the race was cancelled due to the coronavirus pandemic, with all registrants given the option of transferring their entry to 2021, 2022, or 2023 or obtaining a full refund.  Similarly, the 2021 in-person edition of the race was cancelled due to the pandemic, with all registrants given the option of running the race virtually, transferring their entry to 2022, or obtaining a full refund.

Course

The course, which varies slightly from year to year, is certified by USA Track and Field. The current route starts in Arlington, Virginia, on Route 110 and winds its way through Rosslyn along Lee Highway before turning on Spout Run and the George Washington Memorial Parkway. Runners experience a climb on Lee Highway in the first few miles of the course, but are rewarded with a descent along Spout Run and the Parkway.

After crossing Key Bridge into Georgetown, runners used to turn toward the Palisades Community when the course followed Canal Road, up to the reservoir and down MacArthur Boulevard. However, the new course guides runners down popular M Street in Georgetown.

Runners turn on Wisconsin Avenue and then K Street before looping under K street onto Rock Creek Parkway.  The course proceeds approximately 2.5 miles north on Rock Creek Parkway before turning back, then passing the Kennedy Center.  Runners then pass the back of the Lincoln Memorial before continuing on Ohio Drive into Hains Point at the halfway point.

Outside West Potomac Park, runners get a glimpse of the Jefferson Memorial and Tidal Basin. On Independence Avenue, competitors run by the newly unveiled Martin Luther King, Jr. National Memorial and FDR Memorial. The runners loop back along Independence Avenue on the side closest to the National Mall and the Korean War Veterans Memorial and National World War II Memorial before making a left turn onto 15th Street at the Washington Monument.

At Madison Drive, runners pass the north side of the National Mall, running by the Smithsonian Institution's National Museum of American History and the National Gallery of Art. After a loop around the reflecting pool in front of the U.S. Capitol, runners  continue along the south side of the National Mall past the Smithsonian Castle. Runners move along Jefferson Drive and turn onto the 14th Street to marathon's "Beat the Bridge" checkpoint at mile 20 before returning to Virginia.

For the last 10 kilometers, runners enjoy the color and energy of Crystal City. At the Pentagon, runners pass in close proximity to the Pentagon Memorial honoring the victims of 9/11. Finally, the course unfurls alongside the Arlington National Cemetery then offers a final, up-hill challenge to the finish at the Marine Corps War Memorial. This finish has remained unchanged since the inaugural running of the MCM in 1976.

MCM Weekend

MCM10K
In 2006, the Marine Corps Marathon introduced the MCM10K, a  run starting at the National Mall in Washington, DC. The MCM10K and MCM begin simultaneously with MCM10K runners joining the final leg of the marathon course, sharing in the iconic finish up the hill to the Marine Corps War Memorial. Since its inception, the MCM10K has steadily increased in popularity.  In 2012, the event sold out with 10,000 registered runners.

In 2011 a new MCM10K course record was set by Reuben Mwei, a native of the Kenya residing in Acworth, GA. His finishing time of 00:30:37 crushed the previous record of 00:32:54 set by Wyatt Boyd of Washington, DC, in 2009.

MCM Finish Festival
Runners celebrate MCM and MCM10K finishes in the post-event Finish Festival located in Rosslyn, VA. Runners, spectators, and the community are welcome to enjoy food, including a Restaurant Row that includes several Rosslyn eateries, live music, sponsor displays, entertainment and giveaways.

Essential runner services are also located in the Finish Festival, to include Family Link Up, Info/Medical Tent, Massage, UPS Baggage Claim, and the Michelob Ultra Beer Garden. Transportation from the Finish Festival includes shuttles to Crystal City, Metro access at the Rosslyn station and taxi service.

MCM Kids Run
The MCM Kids Run is a  event held annually the day before the MCM. Children ages 5 through 12 are eligible to participate in the fun run located in the Pentagon North Parking Lot. Once children have completed the run, they can visit Camp Miles, a festival area with healthy activities and games promoting physical fitness.

School groups participating in the MCM Kids Run compete for a Healthy School Award. This award is based on student participation and is awarded to the top five schools with the most runners. Winning schools receive a donation to their physical education department presented by MCM partner Sodexo.

MCM Health & Fitness Expo
All registered MCM, MCM10K, and MCM Kids Run participants must attend packet pick up at the MCM Health and Fitness Expo. Held in the two days prior to the MCM, the Health and Fitness Expo features more than 200 booths and interactive displays for runner enjoyment. Supported by nearly 300 military and civilian volunteers, the expo attracts nearly 100,000 runners and guests.

Carbo Dining In
Held annually on the eve of the Marine Corps Marathon, the Carbo Dining In serves up last minute inspiration and excitement as well as carbohydrate fuel for MCM morning.  Held at the headquarters hotel, the Gaylord National Resort and Convention Center, the dinner welcomes world class speakers and Marine Corps - style entertainment.

The unique name - Carbo Dining In - separates it from other pasta parties and carb loads by paying homage to a traditional military dining in, an evening that includes dinner and other events to foster camaraderie and esprit de corps.

The evening program offers music, live entertainment and a featured speaker.  Previous motivational addresses have been provided by Robert Swan, OBE, Dave McGillivary, Kathrine Switzer, Larry Rawson, Deena Kastor and Roger Robinson. Add in appearances by Miles and Molly, the MCM bulldog mascots, amazing prize giveaways, and the camaraderie of fellow runners, this becomes the perfect way to prepare for "The People's Marathon."

MCM Pep Rally
Introduced in 2010, the MCM Pep Rally is open to all marathon runners. The evening offers the chance for runners to receive last-minute information and inspiration from an expert panel of runners, coaches, Clif Pace Team leaders, Brooks consultants, and MCM staff members, among others.

The evening celebrates the achievements of every marathoner with music, cheerleaders, activities, and prize giveaways. First time runners are also presented the coveted MCM First-Timer pin.

Winners

Key: Course record (in bold)

† = Short course
List of winners from Association of Road Racing Statisticians.

Notable finishers
Among the notable finishers are:

Marine Corps Historic Half Marathon
The Marine Corps Historic Half (MCHH), held in Fredericksburg, VA, takes participants on a  journey from the retail hub of Central Park through historic downtown streets, up Hospital Hill, and back to waiting Marines at the finish line. Held annually in May and open to ages 10 and up, the event boasts a field of 8,000 runners. The Historic Half also offers the Semper 5ive, a five-mile event open to 2,000 participants.  New in 2017 is the Devil Dog Double.  Runners competing in this challenge will complete both the Semper 5ive and the Historic Half on Sunday, May 21.  All events finish at the Fredericksburg Expo and Conference Center with the Semper 5ive starting in downtown Fredericksburg.

The Healthy Lifestyle Expo will be held in conjunction with the Marine Corps Historic Half during the days prior to the event.  Located at the Fredericksburg Expo and Conference Center, this free event is open to the public and will showcase health, fitness, food, and exercise through featured vendors such as Mary Washington Hospital, Geico, and Jelly Belly Sport Beans.  Fredericksburg Expo and Conference Center is located at 2371 Carl D. Silver Parkway, Fredericksburg, VA 22401. 

On March 31, 2020, in response to the COVID-19 pandemic, the Marine Corps Historic Half Marathon and all the events planned with it were canceled when Virginia Gov. Ralph Northam ordered a "stay at home" order for the state until June 10. However, on April 27, 2020, the Marine Corps Historic Half Marathon became a virtual event with the help of their technology partner, haku.

MCM Event Series
Held aboard Marine Corps Base Quantico and the surrounding community, the 2017 MCM Event Series features five weekends of events celebrating the accomplishment of distance running by wrapping each event in a unique experience that showcases the organizational excellence of the United States Marine Corps.

March 25 - The first run of the event series, the Marine Corps 17.75K, offers participants the unique opportunity to secure a golden ticket, which is a guaranteed spot in the 2017 MCM. This event celebrates the founding of the United States Marine Corps in 1775 and travels through Prince William Forest Park in Dumfries, VA.

April 29 - Introduced in 2017, the Quantico 100 celebrates the 100th anniversary of Marine Corps Base Quantico.  Participants have 100 minutes to log as many miles as possible during this evening run.

June 10 – Consistently sold out, the Run Amuck and Mini Run Amuck encourage runners to get down and dirty. Run Amuck participants run a  course through trails with mud pits, low crawls and various obstacles culminating in a fire hose dousing just before reaching the finish line. Mini- muckers share in on the fun by completing a scaled-down,  version of the course.

August 19 The Quantico Tri is a sprint distance event held aboard Marine Corps Base Quantico.  Participants complete a  swim, a  bike course, and a  run. For 2014, chip timing was introduced providing the most accurate results for participants.("RunnersWeb   Triathlon: Quantico Tri Introduces Upgrades to Athlete Experience." RunnersWeb   Triathlon: Quantico Tri Introduces Upgrades to Athlete Experience. N.p., n.d. Web. 25 Nov. 2014.)  The Quantico Tri additionally features the Quantico 12K run which runs through the trails of famed Officer Candidates School aboard the Marine Corps Base.

November 18 – The final challenge in the MCM Event Series is the Turkey Trot 10K and accompanying Turkey Trot Mile. The  adult course offers a great way to counteract Thanksgiving calories while kids enjoy getting in on the holiday fun with their own  course. I

Facts and trivia
Start Marathons and other road races are traditionally started with a pistol. The Marine Corps Marathon boasts a slightly bigger starting gun: A 105mm Howitzer. The 2014 starting ceremonies included Medal of Honor recipient, Kyle Carpenter, parachuting to the start and delivering a 7,800 square-foot American flag. (Lin, C. J. "Big Day for Army Runners at 39th Marine Corps Marathon." McClatchy - Tribune Business NewsOct 26 2014. ProQuest. Web. 25 Nov. 2014.)

Ground Pounders Only one individual remains having completed every marathon since the inaugural running in 1976: Al Richmond of Arlington, VA. Fittingly, Richmond is a retired US Marine.  At the 25th running of the MCM, this elite group was given the name "Ground Pounders" at a ceremony at the Washington Post.

Sold Out! The 15th running of the MCM was the first to sell out with a field of 13,000 runners. In 2011 the MCM sold out within 28 hours of registration opening, filling the 30,000 runner capacity. For the 2012 MCM, all 30,000 registration sold out within 2 hours 41 minutes. In 2014, a lottery was introduced for the first time for those applying to run in the Marine Corps Marathon. RACE IT, race services division of Competitor Group, Inc., was awarded a multi-year agreement to provide registration services to facilitate online entries for the MCM. ("Race IT Awarded Marine Corps Marathon Contract." PR Newswire Oct 15 2013. ProQuest. Web. 25 Nov. 2014.)

Challenge Cup The Challenge Cup competition was initiated at the MCM in 1978. The Challenge Cup is a competition between the United States Marine Corps and the British Royal Navy/Marine running teams. An 1897 Victorian silver cup, donated by the British in 1978, is awarded to the winner each year. A female division was added in 1998. The finish time for the top three runners for each team are added and the lowest total running time is declared the winner.

MCM Mascots Miles the Bulldog and his sister Molly are faithful MCM companions, cheering on and entertaining runners at all MCM events. Miles models bib number 1775 to honor the year the USMC was founded, while Molly proudly displays bib number 1943, a nod to the year in which the Marine Corps Women's Reserve was created. In 2011, Miles added "10K Finisher" to his resume when he impressively completed all 6.2 miles of the MCM10K.

USMC Runners The first female active duty Marine MCM winner was 1st Lieutenant Joanna Martin at the 1979 MCM. Martin, a native of Woodbridge, VA and stationed at Camp Pendleton, CA at the time, finished with a time of 2:58:14. Four years later, the first male active duty Marine won the MCM. Sergeant Farley Simon of Alea, Hawaii finished with a time of 2:17:46.

2001 Marine Corps Marathon The status of the 2001 MCM was in serious question until three weeks prior to the scheduled event day. Post-9/11, approval by the Commandant of the Marine Corps to proceed with the marathon was contingent upon a new security plan. With approval in place, mile five on the MCM course gave runners an up-close view of the terrorist attack on the Pentagon. Many 2001 MCM finishers agree this was a very special year.  More than 15,000 runners from 50 states and 39 countries participated in the 26th annual Marine Corps Marathon.

Shadow Runs The Marine Corps Marathon is one of the top stateside military event with sanctioned "shadow runs." In 2014, the shadow run was held at Camp Leatherneck, Afghanistan.(Miller, and Amanda. "Event Rundown." Army Times (2014): 31. ProQuest. Web. 25 Nov. 2014.)

Social Media The popularity of the Marine Corps Marathon continues to grow as more social media sites develop. Blogs, Facebook, YouTube and Twitter.

Notes

References

Further reading
 Banker, George. The Marine Corps Marathon: A Running Tradition. Oxford: Meyer & Meyer Sport (UK) Ltd., 2008. Print.

External links
 MarineMarathon.com, Official website. Contains a detailed history of the origins of the event, and a course description.
Marine Corps Marathon Elevation Profile
 
"ATHLETE" (film) director David Lam's interview with Rick Nealis, Marine Corps Marathon race director

Marathons in the United States
Marathon, Marine Corps
Running in Washington, D.C.
Recurring sporting events established in 1976
Sports in Northern Virginia
Annual sporting events in the United States